Zsolt Felcsuti (born 1971) is a Hungarian-born industrial investor and the major shareholder of the MPF Industry Group. He is also Co-President of the Confederation of Hungarian Employers and Industrialists. In 2022, he has been the 34th most influential person in Hungary.

According to Forbes magazine, his corporation is the first, biggest Hungarian-owned family business with an estimated value of HUF 401.9 billion (USD 1.1 billion). in 2022,  In 2022, he has been ranked as the 3rd richest person in Hungary, with an estimated wealth of between HUF 286.4 billion and HUF 345 billion (USD 0.671 billion and USD 0.863 billion).

Early life
Zsolt Felcsuti is the son of Csaba Felcsuti, who was an engineer and started the company which is now operated by his son. He studied economics at Corvinus University of Budapest.

Career
After years of working in Switzerland as sales and marketing manager Felcsuti came back to Hungary, to find business opportunities for his father’s small enterprise, which was specialized in the production of metal and plastic industry products. According to Forbes Magazine, today this is the third biggest Hungarian owned family business, with revenues of more than 800 million USD, with investments in East-Central Europe and in the Far East, seated in Singapore.

Felcsuti did not privatize any companies, but built a self-created business model based on the East-Central European and Far Eastern labor market and manufacturing sector. He owns one of the largest abrasive products manufacturing company in Europe and East Central Europe’s biggest heating device factory.

Family
Felcsuti is married with two sons, Gábor Felcsuti and Norbert Felcsuti.

Felcsuti family's holding, with an estimated value of HUF 401.9 billion (1.1 billion USD), is Hungary's most valuable family business, ranking at the top of Forbes''' 2022 ranking.

 Additional information 
Felcsuti has conservative values and is right-wing.

According to the 2022 Befolyás-barométer'', Felcsuti is the 34th most influential person in Hungary, up 2 places from the previous year.

He is the chairman of the jury of the "Díj a sikeres vállalkozásokért", launched in August 2013.

He is fluent in English and German and speaks Russian.

He spends most of the year in Switzerland, Hungary and Spain.

References

1971 births
Living people
Hungarian businesspeople